Electronic billing or electronic bill payment and presentment, is when a seller such as company, organization, or group sends its bills or invoices over the internet, and customers pay the bills electronically.  This replaces the traditional method where invoices were sent in paper form and payments were done by manual means such as sending cheques.

There are a number of advantages to electronic billing that include the faster presentation of invoices and reductions in costs in handling paper document.  However to take full advantage of electronic billing both seller and buyer need to have in place computer systems able to handle electronic billing and have access to financial institutions that can do electronic payments.

History
The development of electronic billing and payments started in the late 20th century, and whilst its exact origins are unclear, it is generally agreed that development of electronic billing coincided with the rise of the Information Age. It went hand in hand with the development of internet banking, introduction of accounting software and widespread use of email.

In the United States, the Council for Electronic Billing and Payment of the National Automated Clearing House Association (NACHA) is credited with broadly promoting and communicating various forms of electronic billing in the early 2000s. NACHA promoted activities and initiatives that facilitated the adoption of electronic payments in the areas of Internet commerce, electronic bill payment and presentment, financial electronic data interchange (EDI), international payments, electronic checks, electronic benefits transfer (EBT) and student lending. Certain electronic billing applications also provide the ability to electronically settle payment for goods or services.

Types of electronic billing
 Biller-direct – where consumers make payments directly to one biller that issues bills that they receive at the website of the firm that issued the bill. An example would be of a public utility company offering this payment service to its consumers. A market has emerged for outsourced billing providers who specialize in electronic billing processes and technology for companies that need to send bills directly to their customers.
Bank-aggregator – where a payment is made at an aggregator or consolidator site, usually from a consumer's bank's website. This model allows the consumer to make payments to multiple billers that are pre-registered to receive payments. Examples are OneVu in the UK and eBill in Switzerland. Europe has eBilling too

Parties involved
Billers, bankers, aggregators and consolidators can play various roles in the overall process. Once roles are defined, it is easier to identify which model is most appropriate for the client's strategy. Billers may also implement more than one model in order to best serve their clients. Because the industry is continuously changing and redefining, the options and opportunities will continue to expand.

Biller payment provider (BPP) – An agent of the biller that accepts remittance information on behalf of the Biller. 
Biller service provider (BSP) – An agent of the biller that provides the service for the Biller. 
Consolidator – A biller service provider that consolidates bills from multiple Billers or other bill service providers (BSPs) and delivers them for presentment to the customer service provider (CSP).
Customer service provider (CSP) – An agent of the customer that provides an interface directly to customers, businesses or others for bill presentment. CSP enrolls customers, enables presentment and provides customer care, among other functions.

Slow development due to legacy systems 
In developed countries existing legacy banking systems and rules has slowed down the development of electronic billing.  For example, in the United States financial institutions typically formally prohibit the use of their consumer electronic bill payment systems for payments to certain agencies such as: collection agencies, or recipients of court-ordered payments like child support or alimony. Any organizations or individuals outside of the United States are also usually excluded. Payments to government agencies for utilities such as water are usually permitted.

Electronic bill pay systems fall into two categories, "pay-anyone" services and restricted biller list services.  In a pay-anyone service, the provider will facilitate a payment to the payee regardless of whether they have an electronic connection with that payee or not.  If they cannot deliver the payment to the payee electronically, they will print and mail a paper check on the payer's behalf.  The largest providers of electronic bill pay services can deliver about 80% of their payments electronically, so 20% of payments facilitated by the large pay-anyone services are still made by mailing a paper check to the biller.  This is the primary reason why some billers in a pay-anyone service require as much as a 5-day lead time for the payment to reach the payee.

Restricted biller list payment services allow you to pay any biller that is in the provider's network, and in these services where the provider has an electronic relationship with the biller, the payments will be delivered electronically.

See also
 Electronic invoicing
 Electronic receipt
 Legal Electronic Data Exchange Standard

References

Accounting software
Business software
Payment systems